Sir John Eldon Gorst,  (24 May 1835 – 4 April 1916) was a British lawyer and politician. He served as Solicitor General for England and Wales from 1885 to 1886 and as Vice-President of the Committee on Education between 1895 and 1902.

Background and education
Gorst was born in Preston, Lancashire, the son of Edward Chaddock Gorst, who took the name of Lowndes on succeeding to the family estate in 1853. He graduated third wrangler from St John's College, Cambridge, in 1857, and was admitted to a fellowship.

New Zealand
After beginning to read for the bar in London, his father's illness and death led to his sailing to New Zealand. The Māori had at that time set up a king of their own in the Waikato district and Gorst, who had made friends with the chief Tamihana (William Thomson), known as the kingmaker, established a Maori trade school in Te Awamutu and later acted as an intermediary between the Māori and the government. Sir George Grey made him inspector of schools, then resident magistrate, and eventually civil commissioner in Upper Waikato which the Kingite Maori considered their own land. Tamihana's influence secured his safety at the start of the conflict when chief Rewi Maniapoto of the Ngati Maniapoto tribe and his warriors attempted to kill Gorst. As Gorst was forewarned they made do by destroying the trade school, destroying a printing press and scaring all the settlers out of the Waikato where they had lived peacefully since 1830. This incident and the ambush and killing of British troops walking along a beach near New Plymouth, led to a restart of the war between the Maori King Movement and the New Zealand government in 1863. In 1884 he hosted the Maori King when he and his party came to England to seek an audience with Queen Victoria over issues to do with land. At that time Gorst was a member of the liberal Aborigine Protection League. In 1908 he published a volume of recollections, under the title of New Zealand Revisited: Recollections of the Days of my Youth.

Political and legal career
Gorst then returned to England and was called to the Bar, Inner Temple, in 1865, becoming a Queen's Counsel in 1875. He stood unsuccessfully for Hastings as a Conservative in the 1865 general election, but the next year he entered parliament as member for Cambridge. He served as chairman of the inaugural meeting of the National Union of Conservative and Constitutional Associations in November 1867. He was not re-elected at the 1868 general election. After the Conservative defeat of that year Benjamin Disraeli entrusted him with the reorganization of the party machinery, and in five years of hard work he paved the way for the Conservative success at the general election of 1874.

At a by-election in 1875 Gorst reentered parliament as member for Chatham, which he continued to represent until 1892. He joined Sir Henry Drummond-Wolff, Lord Randolph Churchill and Arthur Balfour in the Fourth Party as an advocate of Tory democracy. When the Conservatives came to power in 1885 under Lord Salisbury he was made Solicitor-General and knighted. The government fell in January 1886 but when the Conservatives returned to office, in July of the same year, he was appointed Under-Secretary of State for India by Salisbury. He was sworn of the Privy Council in 1890 and the following year he became Financial Secretary to the Treasury, a post he held until 1892. Between 1888 and 1891 he also served as deputy chairman of committees in the House of Commons.

At the general election of 1892 Gorst became one of the two members for Cambridge University. On the formation of the third Salisbury administration in 1895 he became Vice-President of the Committee on Education, which he remained until August 1902, when the post was renamed President of the Board of Education. However, he was never a member of the Cabinet. In 1897 he was rumoured to have been the next Governor of New Zealand, although Lord Ranfurly was chosen (and Gorst weas said to have twice refused the Cape governorship, a more exaulted position) . 

Gorst remained committed to the principles of Tory democracy which he had advocated in the days of the Fourth Party, and continued take an active interest in the housing of the poor, the education and care of their children, and in social questions generally, both in parliament and in the press. However, he became exceedingly independent in his political action. In 1905 he contributed to Robert Morant's dispute concerning a school inspection report by Katherine Bathurst about elementary education for under fives. The report's outspokeness had been encouraged by Gorst who was trying to gain a revenge on Morant. This dispute resulted in Bathurst having to resign and for the ministry publishing her report but (unusually) with Morant's apologies and annotations.

Gorst objected to Joseph Chamberlain's proposals for tariff reform, and at the general election of 1906 he stood as an independent Free Trader, but came third, behind the two official Unionist candidates, and lost his seat. He then withdrew from the vice-chancellorship of the Primrose League, of which he had been one of the founders, on the ground that it no longer represented the policy of Benjamin Disraeli. In 1910 he contested Preston as a Liberal, but failed to secure election.

Family
Gorst married Mary Elizabeth Moore in Geelong in 1860; they had met on the Red Jacket travelling from England to Melbourne. Their elder son, Sir Eldon Gorst, became Consul-General in Egypt. Gorst died in London in April 1916, aged 80, and lies buried in St Andrew's churchyard, Castle Combe, Wilts. An account of his connection with Lord Randolph Churchill will be found in the Fourth Party (1906), by his younger son, Harold Edward Gorst.

Publications

References

External links 

 

1835 births
1916 deaths
Politicians from Preston, Lancashire
Conservative Party (UK) MPs for English constituencies
Members of the Parliament of the United Kingdom for the University of Cambridge
Members of the Privy Council of the United Kingdom
Liberal Party (UK) parliamentary candidates
Presidents of the Cambridge Union
Alumni of St John's College, Cambridge
Fellows of St John's College, Cambridge
Fellows of the Royal Society
Rectors of the University of Glasgow
Knights Bachelor
People of the New Zealand Wars
New Zealand jurists
UK MPs 1874–1880
UK MPs 1880–1885
UK MPs 1885–1886
UK MPs 1886–1892
UK MPs 1892–1895
UK MPs 1895–1900
UK MPs 1900–1906
Solicitors General for England and Wales
People educated at Preston Grammar School
Lawyers from Preston, Lancashire